Ken Barrett (born April 27, 1963) is an American field hockey player. He competed in the men's tournament at the 1984 Summer Olympics.

References

External links
 

1963 births
Living people
American male field hockey players
Olympic field hockey players of the United States
Field hockey players at the 1984 Summer Olympics
Sportspeople from Santa Monica, California